Furan-2-ylmethanethiol (2-Furanmethanethiol) is an organic compound containing a furan substituted with a sulfanylmethyl group. It is a clear colourless liquid when pure, but it becomes yellow coloured upon prolonged standing. It possesses a strong odour of roasted coffee and a bitter taste. It is a key component of the aroma of roasted coffee. It has been identified as a trigger molecule for parosmia following COVID-19 infection.

Synthesis 
Furan-2-ylmethanethiol is easily prepared by reacting furfuryl alcohol with thiourea in hydrochloric acid via an intermediate isothiouronium salt which is hydrolized to the thiol by heating with sodium hydroxide.

References 

Flavors
Thiols
2-Furyl compounds